Green Eagles Football Club is a Zambian football club based in Choma, Zambia that plays in the MTN/FAZ Super Division. The club finished the 2016 season in 11th place. There has been notable resurgence by the club, which has shifted the power balance of elite football in Zambia. The Choma-based club have transformed themselves from relegation candidates to title contenders – thanks to the support by their sponsors Zambia National Service (ZNS), focused leadership at the service and the tactics employed by Head Coach Aggrey Chiyangi, who has deservingly served as Chipolopolo care-taker coach. 

In 2018, Eagles finished in 4th position which earned the club qualification to the CAF Confederations Cup. Their best position came in the 2019 season, where they finished in 2nd place and subsequently qualified for the CAF Champions League. In July 2019, Eagles made a debut at the CECAFA Kagame Cup in Rwanda where they were bronze winners after beating AS Maniema Union of DR Congo 2-0 in the third and fourth place playoff match in Kigali. Edward Mwamba and Amity Shamende scored in each half to see Eagles finish third at the tournament.

On 24 August 2019, Green Eagles eliminated South Africa's Orlando Pirates from the CAF Champions League competition as they drew 1-1 in a preliminary round, second leg match at the Orlando Stadium in Soweto, Johannesburg. Tonka Tweende won the tie 2-1 on aggregate having edged the first leg 1-0 in Lusaka, Zambia two weeks earlier.

Stadium
Currently, the team plays at the 1000 capacity Choma Independence Stadium in the city of Choma, Zambia. However, following Eagles debut continental qualification and participation in the 2018/2019 CAF Confederation Cup, their Choma base has been undergoing an upgrade to expand the capacity to 3000.

Players
Goalkeeper: Sebastian Mwange, Robert Mwanza, Kenneth Mwaanga, Justin Munyikwa

Defenders: Bornface Sunzu, Gift Wamundila, Warren Kunda, Michael Mwenya, Samson Manyepa, Andrew Kwiliko, Ray Mutale, Benson Nzuma, Bonston Muchindu

Midfielders: Spencer Sautu, Amitu Shamende, Ceasor Hakaluba, Gozon Mutale, Hosea Silwimba, Samson Chilupe, Mukabanga Susu Siambombe, Christopher Chola
                                                                                                                                       
Forwards: Tapson Kaseba, Edward Mwamba, Shadreck Mulungwe, Mangani Phiri, 

Assistant coach: Alex Namazaba

Former players
Players in bold have been capped internationally.

Kebby Hachipuka
Tapson Kaseba
Venacious Mapande
Bonny Muchindu
Adamson Mulao
Kennedy Musonda
Gozon Mutale
Sebastian Mwange
Francis Tindi Mwanza
Mwansa Nsofwa
Martin Phiri
Mwila Phiri
Amity Shamende
Spencer Sautu

References

External links
 Soccerway

Football clubs in Zambia